Crispine "Chris" Odera (12 December 1963 – 27 November 2012) was a boxer from Kenya, who is best known for winning the gold medal in the men's super-heavyweight division (+ 91 kg) at the 1987 All-Africa Games in Nairobi, Kenya. He represented his native country at the 1988 Summer Olympics in Seoul, South Korea, where he was knocked down in the second round by eventual gold medal winner Lennox Lewis from Canada.

References

External links
Chris Odera's profile at Sports Reference.com

1963 births
2012 deaths
Heavyweight boxers
Super-heavyweight boxers
Boxers at the 1988 Summer Olympics
Olympic boxers of Kenya
Kenyan male boxers
African Games gold medalists for Kenya
African Games medalists in boxing
Competitors at the 1987 All-Africa Games